Marko Stevović (born 1 February 1996) is a Serbian alpine skier. He competed in the 2018 Winter Olympics.

References

1996 births
Living people
Alpine skiers at the 2018 Winter Olympics
Serbian male alpine skiers
Olympic alpine skiers of Serbia
Competitors at the 2017 Winter Universiade